The 2016 Malaysia Cup (Malay: Piala Malaysia 2016) was the 90th edition of Malaysia Cup tournament organised by Football Association of Malaysia.

The 2016 Malaysia Cup began on July with a preliminary round. A total of 16 teams took part in the competition. The teams were divided into four groups, each containing four teams. The group leaders and runners-up teams in the groups after six matches qualified to the quarterfinals. Selangor were the defending champions.

The 2016 Malaysia Cup Final was played between Selangor and Kedah at the Shah Alam Stadium in Shah Alam, Selangor. It was the second time in the tournament's history that both finalists, after the same team faced each other in the last season's final, which Kedah been defeated by Selangor 2–0.

Format 
In the competition, the top 11 teams from the First Round of 2016 Malaysia Super League were joined by the top 5 teams from the First Round of 2016 Malaysia Premier League. The teams were drawn into four groups of four teams.

Round and draw dates
The draw for the 2016 Malaysia Cup was held on 23 May 2016 at Sri Pentas, Persiaran Bandar Utama, Petaling Jaya on live telecast Scoreboard Extra Time with the participating team coaches and captains in attendance.

Seeding

Group stage

Group A

Group B

Group C

Group D

Knockout stage

In the knockout stage, teams played against each other over two legs on a home-and-away basis, except for the one-match final. The mechanism of the draws for each round was as follows:
In the draw for the quarter final, the fourth group winners were seeded, and the fourth group runners-up were unseeded. The seeded teams were drawn against the unseeded teams, with the seeded teams hosting the second leg. Teams from the same group or the same association could not be drawn against each other.
In the draws for the quarter-finals onwards, there were no seedings, and teams from the same group or the same association could be drawn against each other.

Bracket

Quarter-finals
The first legs were played on 28 August 2016, and the second legs were played on 17 September 2016.

Semi-finals
The first legs were played on 30 September & 1 October 2016, and the second legs were played on 15 October 2016.

Final

The final were played on 30 October 2016 at the Shah Alam Stadium in Shah Alam, Selangor.

Statistics

Top scorers 
Statistics exclude play-off round.

Own goals

Hat-tricks

Source:

Winners

References

External links
Football Malaysia Official Website - (Malaysia Cup)

2016 in Malaysian football
Malaysia Cup seasons
Malaysia Cup